Malkolm Johan Henrik Nilsson Säfqvist (born 3 August 1993) is a Swedish footballer who plays as a goalkeeper for Halmstads BK.

Career
Malkolm Nilsson is born in Stockholm, but grew up in Halmstad. Nilsson have only played in Halmstad throughout his career. He first played for IS Örnia, before moving to BK Astrio after a couple of seasons. In 2010, he transferred to Halmstads BK and in 2013 he wrote his first senior contract with the club. He made his debut March 10, 2013, after coming on as a substitute against Syrianska FC in Svenska Cupen. Following seasons he's been out on loan in both Lunds BK and Östers IF, both clubs playing in Swedish Division 1 at the time.

Nilsson's Allsvenskan-debut came in Halmstads 2–1-win against Hammarby on October 31, the last game of the 2015 season. At that point, Halmstad were already relegated to Superettan.

Career statistics

Club

References

External links
 
 Halmstads BK profile
 

1993 births
Living people
Footballers from Stockholm
Association football goalkeepers
Swedish footballers
Allsvenskan players
Halmstads BK players